Interstate 494 Bridge may refer to:
I-494 Minnesota River Bridge, a bridge spanning the Minnesota River, built in 1982
Wakota Bridge, a bridge spanning the Mississippi River, built in 2006

Bridge